Lock-on or Lock On may refer to:
 Radar lock-on, where a radar automatically tracks a selected target
 Lock-on (protest tactic), when one or more protesters locks themselves to an inanimate object

Video games 
 Lock-on, a tactic in action video games where the player character targets an enemy, causing all movement to revolve around that enemy
 Lock-On (video game), an arcade, PC, and Atari ST game
 Lock On: Modern Air Combat, a PC flight simulator
 Super Air Diver, an SNES video game called Lock On in North America
 Lock-On Technology, a video game cartridge connection technology, used in Sonic & Knuckles for the Sega Genesis

Other 
 Lock On (street art), a genre of street art in which installations are locked to public furniture
 Sega Lock-On, a toy laser-tag game
 Lockon Stratos, a Mobile Suit Gundam 00 character